The Triton River in Boeotia, Greece ran into Lake Copais. The towns of Athenae and Eleusis were located on the river and were both destroyed in an inundation.

A temple to Athena was located on the river in the town of Alalcomenae.

Notes

Geography of ancient Boeotia
Rivers of Central Greece